Thomas Duval 'Val' Guest, Jr. (born April 7, 1960 Greenville, South Carolina) is an American politician, lawyer, and a member of the Republican Party. He is member of the South Carolina House of Representatives from the 106th District. The former incumbent, Russell Fry,  is the Representative for South Carolina's 7th congressional district, after unseating incumbent congressman Tom Rice in the primary. Rice, who served as the district's representative since 2013, lost significant popularity after voting to impeach Donald Trump.

Guest serves on the House Judiciary Committee as well as on the House Legislative Oversight Committee.

A Myrtle Beach, South Carolina resident, Guest is a partner in the law firm Ouverson, Guest & Carter, PA, in Murrells Inlet.

Guest has an undergraduate degree in business from The Citadel (1982) and a 1989 graduate, with a J.D. of the University of South Carolina School of Law.

References

Living people
Republican Party members of the South Carolina House of Representatives
2022 South Carolina elections
South Carolina lawyers
The Citadel, The Military College of South Carolina alumni
University of South Carolina School of Law alumni
People from Myrtle Beach, South Carolina
1960 births